Saint Thomas is an unincorporated community in Knox County, Indiana, in the United States.

History
A post office was established at Saint Thomas in 1896, and remained in operation until it was discontinued in 1901. The community took its name from Saint Thomas Church.

References

Unincorporated communities in Knox County, Indiana
Unincorporated communities in Indiana